chelmico (チェルミコ cherumiko) is a female rap duo from Japan composed of Rachel Watashiga and Mamiko Suzuki, known professionally as Rachel and Mamiko, respectively. 'chelmico' is a portmanteau of the duo's names.

Career 
chelmico formed in 2014 after Rachel Watashiga and Mamiko Suzuki met through a mutual friend at a McDonald's in Arakawa, in Tokyo, Japan. The two bonded over a love of music, particularly over Japanese hip-hop group Rip Slyme, and soon became regular friends. At the time, Watashiga did some modeling work and appeared in the background of music videos for Ōmori Seiko. When one of her friends offered her 10 minutes during a music event they were organizing in spring of 2014, Watashiga invited Suzuki to rap with her.

The next step came a year later, when they were given another offer to perform at another show for fifteen minutes. The two reached out to rapper PAGE, then known as Holly Page, to provide a track while they wrote lyrics. The end result was Labyrinth '97, their first single. Their first self-titled album was released in October 2016 under the Cupcake ATM label. In 2018, they released their album POWER under unBORDE, a division of Warner Music Japan, who they have been with since then.

Their single, Easy Breezy, (released January 17, 2020) was used as the opening theme song for the anime adaptation of Keep Your Hands Off Eizouken! Later that year, they appeared on the m-flo single RUN AWAYS.

Two singles, milk and Disco (Bad dance doesn't matter), were released in July and August (respectively) preempting their third album, maze. The album released on August 26, 2020.

On March 14, 2021, Rachel announced she would take a hiatus from performing due to her marriage and pregnancy. She expressed a hope to return to music by the end of the year. Rachel announced she gave birth to her first child on June 7, 2021.

The duo released their third EP, 'COZY' on April 16, 2021, following the release of their single of the same name earlier that month.

On November 19, 2021, the duo released a single entitled '300 Million Yen'. This was followed by another single on March 17, 2022, titled 'Meidaimae'. Both of these would feature in their next studio album, 'Gokigen', which released on June 1, 2022.

Members

Rachel 
 Name: 
 Birth date:  
 Birthplace: Kanagawa Prefecture

Mamiko 
 Name: 
 Birth date:  
 Birthplace: Tokyo

Discography

Studio albums

Mini-albums

Singles

Additional music work 
 Trekkie Trax The Best 2016–2017 (2018)
 1. "Love Is Over"
 19. "Love Is Over" (Tomggg Remix)
 Onigawara – チョコレイトをちょうだい (2015)
 2. "YOU×3"
 Ken Hirai – Half of Me (2018)
 2. "Holic"
 Back Street Girls – Idol Kills (2019)
 8. Why
 m-flo – "Run Aways" (2020) (as m-flo♡chelmico)

Cast

Radio 
 chelmico - But It's Still Saturday  (Scheduled to air from January 4, 2020 - the end of March on TBS Radio)
 Ogi Yahagi no Meganebiiki  (January 3, 2020 on TBS Radio)  (Mamiko only)
 All Night Nippon 0 (ZERO) (May 18, 2019 on Nippon Broadcasting)

References

External links 
 
 YouTube channel
 Twitter account
 Instagram account

Musical groups established in 2014
2014 establishments in Japan
Musical groups from Tokyo
Japanese musical duos
Hip hop duos